Yamekraw, a Negro Rhapsody is a jazz musical composition written by James P. Johnson in 1927 about a neighborhood of Savannah, Georgia. It was a response to George Gershwin's Rhapsody in Blue. It was initially composed for the piano, but was first performed at Carnegie Hall as a jazz-like orchestral arrangement. A recording was made of Johnson performing the music on piano. A film inspired by the song was also made.

Song name

Yamacraw was a black neighborhood in Savannah, Georgia. The song was inspired by the culture of the neighborhood, and billed as a more "authentic" rhapsody.

Film
Murray Roth directed a short 1930 musical film inspired by the song. The film has been referred to by the title Yamekraw and Yamacraw. It is a Vitaphone Varieties film produced by Warner Brothers. The film depicts a poor man from a rural area travelling to a large city where he encounters a dancer. Jimmy Mordecai portrayed the lead character. In the film, Yamekraw is described as a settlement outside Savannah, Georgia. The film was shown in 2009. The song is included on the album The Symphonic Jazz of James P. Johnson.

See also
 Yamacraw Bluff

References

External links 
 
 

1927 songs
Jazz songs
Songs with music by James P. Johnson